Bertrange-Strassen railway station is a railway station in Bertrange, in south-western Luxembourg.  It also serves the town of Strassen, which lies to the north.  It is operated by Chemins de Fer Luxembourgeois, the state-owned railway company.

The station is situated on Line 50, which connects Luxembourg City to the west of the country and the Belgian town of Arlon.

External links
 Official CFL page on Bertrange-Strassen station
 Rail.lu page on Bertrange-Strassen station

Bertrange
Railway stations in Luxembourg
Railway stations on CFL Line 50